Snobs are people who believe in a correspondence between status and human worth.

Snobs may also refer to:
Snobs (club), a nightclub in Birmingham, England
Snobs (novel), a 2004 novel by Julian Fellowes
Snobs (TV series), a 2003 Australian television series
South Australian Mining Association investors, derided as "Snobs", i.e. tradesmen, in the word's original meaning
Snobs (film), a 1915 American comedy silent film
The Snobs, a British rock band

See also
 
The Snob (disambiguation)